Estriol triacetate is an estrogen medication and an estrogen ester – specifically, the triacetate ester of estriol – which was never marketed. It has been said to be 10 times as physiologically active as estriol.

See also
 List of estrogen esters § Estriol esters

References

Abandoned drugs
Acetate esters
Estriol esters
Phenols
Synthetic estrogens
Triols